Alexander Kozlovsky may refer to:

  (1864–1940), Russian general, took part in the Kronstadt rebellion
 Alexander Kozlovsky (politician, born 1944), Russian politician
 Alexander Kozlovsky (politician, born 1973), Russian politician